Cinnamomum philippinense is a species of flowering plant in the family Lauraceae, native to Taiwan and the Philippines. It was first described by Elmer Drew Merrill in 1906 as Machilus philippinensis.

Conservation
In 1998, Persea philippinensis was assessed as "vulnerable" and said to be endemic to the Philippines. , P. philippinensis is regarded one of the synonyms of Cinnamomum philippinense, which has a distribution that includes Taiwan.

References

philippinense
Flora of the Philippines
Flora of Taiwan
Plants described in 1906